Tāmaki is a small suburb of East Auckland, 11 kilometres from the Auckland CBD, in the North Island of New Zealand. It is located by the banks of the estuarial Tāmaki River, which is a southern arm of the Hauraki Gulf. The suburb is between the suburbs of Point England to the north and Panmure to the south.

Tāmaki is under the local governance of Auckland Council. It is part of the much larger Tāmaki parliamentary electorate.

Demographics

Tamaki had a population of 4,278 at the 2018 New Zealand census, an increase of 324 people (8.2%) since the 2013 census, and an increase of 345 people (8.8%) since the 2006 census. There were 1,167 households, comprising 2,118 males and 2,160 females, giving a sex ratio of 0.98 males per female. The median age was 30.5 years (compared with 37.4 years nationally), with 1,026 people (24.0%) aged under 15 years, 1,080 (25.2%) aged 15 to 29, 1,785 (41.7%) aged 30 to 64, and 384 (9.0%) aged 65 or older.

Ethnicities were 30.5% European/Pākehā, 25.5% Māori, 42.6% Pacific peoples, 18.7% Asian, and 2.7% other ethnicities. People may identify with more than one ethnicity.

The percentage of people born overseas was 35.8, compared with 27.1% nationally.

Although some people chose not to answer the census's question about religious affiliation, 29.9% had no religion, 51.3% were Christian, 3.5% had Māori religious beliefs, 2.2% were Hindu, 2.4% were Muslim, 2.2% were Buddhist and 2.3% had other religions.

Of those at least 15 years old, 531 (16.3%) people had a bachelor's or higher degree, and 687 (21.1%) people had no formal qualifications. The median income was $22,700, compared with $31,800 nationally. 276 people (8.5%) earned over $70,000 compared to 17.2% nationally. The employment status of those at least 15 was that 1,479 (45.5%) people were employed full-time, 399 (12.3%) were part-time, and 222 (6.8%) were unemployed.

Education
These schools are adjacent to each other. Both schools are coeducational. Rolls are as of

Volcano
To the west of the suburb is Mount Wellington, a 137-metre volcanic peak which is part of the Auckland volcanic field, and which was formed by an eruption around 9,000 years ago.

Related names
By a quirk of geographical naming, the suburb of East Tāmaki is located several kilometres to the south of Tāmaki because it takes its name from the fact that it is on the eastern side of the Tamaki River, rather than from its relationship to Tāmaki.

The name Tāmaki was the Māori name for the Auckland isthmus, and was later applied to the eastern part of early Auckland (towards the Tamaki River), as in the name of the Tamaki Road Board.

The name Tāmaki is of contested origin. It is an ancient Polynesian word for battle; it can also mean full of people, i.e., heavily populated – an ironic possibility given that the Maori name of the heavily populated Auckland isthmus in Māori is Tāmaki-makau-rau. A third possible origin of the names is Tā-Maki, meaning successful attack by Maki, which was the name of a local tribal chief.

References

Suburbs of Auckland
Populated places on the Tāmaki River